Sotavento Region is one of the regions of Veracruz, Mexico.

Geography
Sotavento Region lies on the southern Gulf Coastal Plain. Sotavento means leeward, and the region lies in the rain shadow of the coastal Sierra de Chiconquiaco, which makes it drier than the rest of Veracruz' coastal lowlands to the north and south. The Veracruz dry forests ecoregion covers much of the region.

It is bounded on the northeast by the Gulf of Mexico, on the east and south by Papaloapan Region, on the west by Mountains Region, and on the north by Capital Region.

Notes

References 

 

Regions of Veracruz